Island Express Air was a small Canadian airline based in Abbotsford, British Columbia. Its first flight was on August 7, 2009 as part of the Abbotsford International Airshow. It operated scheduled air service between the Lower Mainland and Vancouver Island, as well as charter flights and cargo service. On February 23, 2018, one of their B100 King Air's crashed at Abbotsford Airport (CYXX) immediately after take-off in blizzard conditions. As a result of this accident, and due to public safety concerns, Transport Canada suspended Island Express' Air Operator's Certificate(AOC) shortly thereafter, on February 28, 2018. However, following a robust review of the company's safety procedures the operating certificate was reinstated on June 26, 2018.  The company slogan was Your Island Connection. 

In 2020, amid the COVID-19 pandemic, Island Express Air ceased operations and sold its assets to a group of investors. Company Went Bankrupt.

Destinations
All destinations as of August 2019 were within British Columbia:
 Abbotsford (Abbotsford International Airport)
 Nanaimo (Nanaimo Airport)
 Qualicum Beach (Qualicum Beach Airport)
 Seasonal: Tofino (Tofino/Long Beach Airport)
 Vancouver (Vancouver International Airport)
 Victoria (Victoria International Airport)

Fleet
Fleet as of August 2019:

See also
 History of aviation in Canada
 List of defunct airlines of Canada

References

External links
 Official website

Abbotsford, British Columbia
Defunct airlines of Canada
Airlines established in 2009
Airlines disestablished in 2020
Regional airlines of British Columbia
2009 establishments in British Columbia
2020 disestablishments in British Columbia
Defunct companies of British Columbia
Airlines disestablished due to the COVID-19 pandemic